Mongolia participated in the 1998 Asian Games held in Bangkok, Thailand from December 6, 1998, to December 20, 1998. Athletes from Mongolia succeeded in winning two golds, two silvers and ten bronzes, making total fourteen medals. Mongolia finished nineteenth in a medal table.

Medal summary

Medals by sport

Medalists

Boxing

Judo

Shooting

Wrestling

References

Nations at the 1998 Asian Games
1998
Asian Games